Phytoecia bodemeyeri is a species of beetle in the family Cerambycidae. It was described by Reitter in 1913. It is known from Iran.

References

Phytoecia
Beetles described in 1913